Venus, the second planet from the Sun, is classified as a terrestrial planet. It is sometimes called Earth's "sister planet" due to their similar size, gravity, and bulk composition (Venus is both the closest planet to Earth and the planet closest in size to Earth). The surface of Venus is covered by a dense atmosphere and presents clear evidence of former violent volcanic activity. It has shield and composite volcanoes similar to those found on Earth.

Valles
Cytherean valleys are called by the Latin term valles, and are named after river goddesses or after words for the planet Venus (including terms for the morning star or evening star specifically) in various languages.

Undae
Undae on Venus refer to dune fields and are named after desert goddesses.

Tesserae

Tesserae are areas of polygonal terrain. They are named after goddesses in world mythologies.

Rupes

Scarps on Venus are called rupes and are named after goddesses of the hearth.

Tholi

Regio

Planum

Planitia

Paterae

Lineae

Labyrinthus

Fossae

Fluctus

Farra

Dorsa

Colles

Chasma

See also
List of coronae on Venus
List of craters on Venus
List of extraterrestrial dune fields
List of montes on Venus
List of terrae on Venus

Notes

References
USGS

Surface features of Venus
Venus-related lists